"Señorita" is a song written by Danny Flowers, and Hank DeVito, and recorded by American country music artist Don Williams.  It was released in February 1987 as the fourth single from the album New Moves.  The song reached number 9 on the Billboard Hot Country Singles & Tracks chart.

Chart performance

References

1987 singles
Don Williams songs
Songs written by Danny Flowers
Song recordings produced by Garth Fundis
Capitol Records Nashville singles
1987 songs
Songs written by Hank DeVito